JVC is a Japanese consumer electronics company.

JVC may also refer to:
 JVC Broadcasting, a private company and radio stations owner in New York
 Jon Van Caneghem, an American video game director, designer and producer
 Jesuit Volunteer Corps, an organization of lay volunteers
 JVC Cuijk, a Dutch association football club
 JVCKenwood, a company formed from the merger of JVC and Kenwood Corporation
 JVCKenwood Victor Entertainment, a subsidiary of JVC